Under the Red Sea is the 1952 English-language version of a 1951 Austrian documentary film about the attempts of Austrian marine biologist Hans Hass to record the sounds of marine animals in the Red Sea. It was co-produced by Thalia Productions and RKO Radio Pictures, which released the film on October 2, 1952. The film was narrated by Les Tremayne.

References

American documentary films
Austrian documentary films
1952 documentary films
1952 films
RKO Pictures films
Documentary films about marine biology
Red Sea
Films produced by Sol Lesser
Films featuring underwater diving
Alternative versions of films
1950s English-language films
1950s American films

de:Abenteuer im Roten Meer